László Laky (born 6 February 2000) is a Hungarian professional footballer who plays for KFC Komárno.

Career statistics

.

References

External links

2000 births
Sportspeople from Székesfehérvár
Living people
Hungarian footballers
Association football goalkeepers
Hungary youth international footballers
Puskás Akadémia FC players
Puskás Akadémia FC II players
Kaposvári Rákóczi FC players
Békéscsaba 1912 Előre footballers
Komáromi FC footballers
KFC Komárno players
Nemzeti Bajnokság I players
Nemzeti Bajnokság II players
Nemzeti Bajnokság III players
2. Liga (Slovakia) players
Expatriate footballers in Slovakia
Hungarian expatriate footballers
21st-century Hungarian people